The Frontier Force Regiment is one of the six infantry regiments of the Pakistan Army. They are popularly known as the Piffers in reference to their military history as the PIF (Punjab Irregular Force) of the British Indian Army, or as the FF (Frontier Force). The regiment takes its name from the historic North-West Frontier, a former province of British India and later Pakistan (present-day Khyber Pakhtunkhwa).

Most of the regiment's ancestral military formations were units composed of infantry of either Punjabi or Pathan origin. However, the oldest unit of the regiment is the Scinde Camel Corps, raised in 1843 under Company rule in India. Another ancestral unit was the infantry component of the British Indian Army Corps of Guides (partial cavalry unit). Despite being a Pakistani regiment, the Frontier Force Regiment is also the successor to several Sikh regiments due to their widespread deployments in the North-West Frontier during the British Raj.

Presently, the regiment consists of 59 battalions, with its regimental centre located in Abbottabad, Khyber Pakhtunkhwa. Due to this regiment's presence, Abbottabad is also locally known as the "Home of the Piffers". In its current form, the Frontier Force Regiment consists of both mechanized and motorized infantry battalions; there are also some armoured and artillery battalions which were raised from the ranks of the Frontier Force or one of its predecessor regiments.

The modern Frontier Force is Pakistan's third-oldest military regiment in terms of the date of most recent amalgamation, behind the Punjab and Baloch regiments. The regiment was raised in its current form in 1957, through the amalgamation of two (with a later third component) former British Indian Army regiments: the 12th Frontier Force Regiment and the 13th Frontier Force Rifles. The third component, the Pathan Regiment, had been raised from the elements of the former two. The regiments' merger took place when a major formation reorganization was carried out in the Pakistan Army.

Battalions of the Frontier Force Regiment have seen extensive wartime combat with neighbouring India during all of the Indo-Pakistani wars that have occurred since the Partition of India in 1947. Outside of the subcontinent, the regiment's elements have also served overseas, having been deployed to Saudi Arabia in the Middle East and to Somalia in Eastern Africa as part of the 1990s United Nations humanitarian peacekeeping force in Somalia. In the latter deployment, Frontier Force battalions participated in the Battle of Mogadishu in 1993.

The battalions are divided under independent formations and are commanded by their formation commander. Training and record-keeping is undertaken by the regimental depot, which is usually directed by a brigadier. The regiment's highest-ranking officer is given the honorary title of Colonel-Commandant (usually for Lieutenant-Generals) or "Colonel-in-Chief" (for the Chief of Army Staff or Chairman of the Joint Chiefs of Staff Committee).

Origins

The Frontier Force Regiment came into being in 1957 with the amalgamation of the Frontier Force Regiment, the Frontier Force Rifles and the Pathan Regiment, all of which had their origins in the British Indian Army. During the 1840s, after the first and second Anglo-Sikh Wars, Colonel Sir Henry Lawrence, the Honourable East India Company's agent to the Lahore Durbar (brother of the later Lieutenant-Governor of the Punjab Sir John Lawrence, 1st Baron Lawrence) sanctioned the raising of the Corps of Guides and a number of infantry regiments by incorporating veterans from the disbanded Sikh Khalsa army. During the early 1850s some of Lawrence's Sikh regiments were designated the "Punjab Irregular Force", giving rise to the "Piffer" nickname which the Regiment carries to the present day, and through a series of reorganisations that culminated in 1922, these units would eventually become the 12th Frontier Force Regiment and 13th Frontier Force Rifles. The use of the pre-fixing regimental numbers was discontinued in 1945, the two regiments becoming the Frontier Force Regiment and the Frontier Force Rifles, and both regiments were transferred to Pakistan by the United Kingdom in 1947, on the independence to British India.

The Pathan Regiment was raised after independence from the 4th Battalion of the Frontier Force Regiment and the 4th and 15th Battalions of the Frontier Force Rifles. Initially the regimental depot was at Dera Ismail Khan but it relocated to Kohat in 1949 and was later merged into the Frontier Force Regiment with its regimental depot at Abbottabad. Fifteen of the modern Frontier Force Regiment's 52 battalions trace their origins back to British Indian Army units, as tabulated below.

Composition

At present, the Frontier Force Regiment musters 67 infantry battalions, some of which are mechanised or motorised with the remainder known colloquially as "foot infantry". Each battalion is subdivided into four companies, normally named Alpha, Bravo, Charlie, and Delta. The regiment also includes armoured and artillery units, established from among its strength. All Piffer battalions serve alongside other Pakistan Army units in mixed formations; operational control resides with the appropriate brigade, whereas administrative control remains with the Frontier Force regimental depot. The regiment recruits mostly from the Pashtun tribes of Khyber-Pakhtunkhwa, although officers and other ranks from all over Pakistan have served and continue to serve in the regiment. Prior to 2000, the Piffers had been standardised to include equal numbers of Pashtuns and Punjabis in its non-officer ranks, but in 2000, this composition was amended to include 10% Sindhis and 5% Balochis, reducing the quota of Punjabis to 35%. This measure was intended to diminish segregation within the Army.

Headquarters
The regiment is currently based in Khyber-Pakhtunkhwa's city of Abbottabad, which also houses the depots of the Baloch Regiment and the Army Medical Corps. The city was originally the headquarters of the Frontier Force Rifles prior to their merger with the Frontier Force Regiment and the Pathan Regiment (then based at Sialkot and Kohat respectively). The Abbottabad depot is responsible for the regiment's basic recruit training. Initially recruits are trained for a period of 36 weeks. Since 1981 has housed the Piffer Museum, which records the Piffer's regimental history. The museum's collection includes medals, weapons, dress and insignia, portraits and flags, history books, albums, paintings, cutlery and musical instruments. This was originally erected at Kohat by Field Marshal William Birdwood on 23 October 1924 in the memory of those killed in World War I, but in 1964 on the orders of the then Commander-in-Chief General Muhammad Musa, it was moved to Abbottabad. It was unveiled in Abbottabad in April 1965. A Roll of Honour is displayed around the memorial on plates, and wreath-laying ceremonies are held on important national days and by visitors. Later a replica of the memorial was built at its original location at Kohat in 2001.

Kashmir dispute
Since independence in 1947, India and Pakistan have fought three major wars and one minor war, and have been involved in an ongoing conflict since 1984.  The casus belli for most of these is the dispute between the two countries over the status of the state of Kashmir. Piffers participated in each of these conflicts with the participation in the war of 1947 by its founding formations.

Indo-Pakistani War of 1965

Concerned by what it saw as Indian attempts to absorb the disputed region of Kashmir, in 1965 Pakistan launched Operation Gibraltar to foment a popular uprising against Indian control in Jammu and Kashmir.  However, the operation did not produce the hoped-for results, and following a period of escalating clashes between Indian and Pakistani troops and irregulars from April to September, the Indo-Pakistani War of 1965 began. Also known as the Second Kashmir War (the first having been fought in 1947), the five-week conflict led to territorial gains and losses, and caused thousands of casualties, on both sides, before ending in a United Nations mandated ceasefire followed by Russian mediation.

The Frontier Force Regiment's units participated in the war in all active sectors along the Indo-Pakistani border, including Kashmir, Chhamb, Sialkot, Lahore, Khemkaran and Rajasthan. The 6th and 12th FF were involved in the advance on the Chhamb–Jaurian–Akhnur axis,  and the 6th FF also fought in the Badiana-Chawinda-Pasrur axis, along with the Guides Cavalry, the 11th Cavalry, 1st SP Artillery and the 3rd, 4th, 9th, 13th and 14th FF, where the largest tank battle at that time since World War II was fought. The 3rd FF Battalion, while defending the border opposite Maharajke, was run over by the Indian Army's armoured division.  The 7th, 11th, 15th and 16th FF took part in the defence of Lahore; the 1st, 2nd, 5th and 10th FF took part in the capture of Khem Karan in the Kasur Sector, and the 8th and 18th FF made significant gains in the Rajhistan Sector. Some fighting continued after the ceasefire, and two months later in the Rajhistan Sector, the 23rd FF re-captured the Sadhewala Post. The three Piffer armoured regiments successfully repulsed the Indian offensive in the Sialkot sector, while the Guides Cavalry turned back repeated assaults from India's 1st Armoured Division. Another armoured regiment (the 11th Cavalry) also fought at Chhamb as part of the newly raised 6th Armoured Division. The 1st SP Field Artillery, while providing fire support in the battle of Chawinda, lost their commanding officer Lieutenant Colonel Abdul Rehman.  Recognizing their combat performance, the unit was authorised to wear red piping on their collars.

Indo-Pakistani War of 1971

In 1971, following a divisive election result, civil war broke out in the former East Pakistan (now Bangladesh) between the West Pakistani administrative authorities and the majority local population. India, to where many of East Pakistan's exiled political leaders and refugees from the fighting had fled, provided support for the dissidents including arming and training a Bangladeshi irregular force (the Mukti Bahini). To relieve pressure on their forces in the east, in December 1971 Pakistani forces launched a pre-emptive attack on India from the west, which was only partially successful and met with massive retaliation. Fighting on two fronts, Pakistan agreed to a ceasefire after the surrender of her forces in the east and territorial losses in the west (later ceded back to Pakistan following the 1972 Simla Agreement).

Piffer units fought in both east and west. The 31st FF, Pakistan's first national service battalion, raised in November 1971 just before the war, was deployed at Lahore and in the Khemkaran Sector. In East Pakistan, the 4th and 13th FF were present at the Battle of Hilli, where 4th FF held its position until ordered out. Major Muhammad Akram of the 4th FF was posthumously awarded Pakistan's highest award for gallantry, the Nishan-e-Haider. Other units which operated from East Pakistan were the 12th, 15th, 22nd, 24th, 25th, 26th, 30th and 38th FF. They became prisoners of war once Dhaka fell to the Indian army in December 1971.

In West Pakistan, the 11th Cavalry saw heavy fighting in the Chhamb sector. The 2nd FF Battalion, while defending Shisabladi post at Kashmir sector, drove back an Indian brigade. Along with 2nd FF 3rd, 5th, 17th and 33rd FF also operated in the Kashmir sector. In the Sialkot sector, the 19th, 23rd, 27th, 29th, 35th and 37th FF took part in fighting. The 35th FF Battalion suffered heavy casualties in an offensive at Jarpal, the area captured a day before.  An Indian commander, Lieutenant-Colonel V P Airy, of the 3rd Grenadier Guards who fought against 35th FF said: "35 FF's immortal attack won their commanding officer, Lieutenant-Colonel Akram Raja, a posthumous Hilal-i-Jur'at, with the highest compliment a gallant soldier could receive".
The 8th and 18th FF fought on the Lahore front. In the Sulemanki sector, the 6th FF gained fame when it captured the Beriwala Bridge on Sabuna Drain on 3 December  and repulsed five attempts by opposition forces to retake it.  Major Shabbir Sharif, a holder of the Sitara-e-Jurat from the 1965 conflict, was awarded a posthumous Nishan-e-Haider. The 36th FF also fought in the Sulemanki sector, and the 20th, 21st, and 39th FF saw action in the Rajhisthan sector. After enemy offensive the 21st and 39th FF withdrew from Parbat Ali, a stronghold in that sector.

Siachen conflict

Following a period of tension, in April 1984 the Indian Army launched Operation Meghdoot with the aim of capturing the glacier. Pakistan responded in kind, but Indian troops had already occupied the major mountain passes west of the glacier and captured many strategic points. Both countries established military posts, and from 1984 until 2003, intermittent fighting took place. The conflict is remarkable for the harsh conditions under which it was fought—on average, one Pakistani soldier died every fourth day, with most of the casualties caused by the severe climate.

A number of Piffer units were deployed to the world's highest battleground, including the 3rd, 4th, 8th, 24th, 26th, 28th, 31st, 36th, 38th, 39th and 47th FF. In addition, some Northern Light Infantry Battalions, who were the first to arrive, were led by Piffer officers. Frontier Force casualties in the conflict include three officers, two junior commissioned officers, and 81 other ranks killed in action.

Kargil War

The town and district of Kargil in Jammu and Kashmir lies on the Line of Control (LOC), the de facto border between Pakistan and India in the Kashmir region. In May 1999 elements in the Pakistan Armed Forces covertly trained and sent troops and paramilitary forces into Indian territory. The aim was to sever the link between Kashmir and Ladakh, and cause Indian forces to withdraw from the Siachen Glacier, thus forcing India to negotiate a settlement of the broader Kashmir dispute. The Kargil Conflict was triggered when Pakistan occupied around 130 Indian observation posts on the Indian side of the LOC. As India responded, regular Pakistan army units were called up.

The 19th, 33rd, 38th and 44th FF Battalions, and some Piffer officers serving in Northern Light Infantry battalions, participated in the conflict. In total four officers and twenty four other ranks were killed in action. The war ended after the then Prime Minister of Pakistan, Nawaz Sharif, agreed to call the troops back on 4 July 1999, after meeting with U.S President Bill Clinton.

International duty

Operations

The Frontier Force Regiment has served outside Pakistan in various multinational and peacekeeping roles. From 1981 to 1988, the Piffer's mechanised infantry battalions were stationed at Tabuk, Saudi Arabia, as part of a Pakistani armoured brigade allocated for the defence of the Islamic holy land. However, the brigade was withdrawn after the Government of Pakistan was unable to accede to a Saudi request that only Sunnis be included in the troops sent to their land. Then President of Pakistan, General Zia-ul-Haq said, there was no discrimination in the Pakistan Armed Forces.

Pakistan formed part of the multinational coalition force that participated in the 1991 Gulf War. Deploying up to 5,500 troops in a strictly defensive role, the Pakistani contingent included the 63rd FF Battalion, which was stationed at Tabuk and Arar until the cessation of hostilities. The early 1990s also saw Pakistan's increased participation in UN peacekeeping operations. In 1992, the 7th FF Battalion spearheaded the UN military mission to Somalia. The US Marine landing on Mogadishu beach was in an area secured by the 7th FF, and the 5th, 8th and 15th FF were also deployed to the region. On 3 October 1993, the 15th FF's Quick Reaction Force participated in the Pakistani-led rescue operation of a force of US Rangers that had become pinned down in Mogadishu; contrary to the fictionalised depiction of events in the movie Black Hawk Down, a number of Rangers were taken to safety in the 15th's armoured personnel carriers.

Following the operation the United Nations Secretary General's Special Representative, Admiral Jonathan Howe and UNOSOM Force Commander, Lieutenant General Çevik Bir appreciated Pakistani troops' efforts and thanked them for helping the US troops. Major General Thomas M. Montgomery, Deputy Commander of the United Nations Forces in Somalia while praising Pakistani forces' said in a television interview, "Many of the soldiers are alive today because of the willingness and skill of the Pakistani soldiers who worked jointly in a rescue operation with Malaysian and American soldiers in most difficult and dangerous combat circumstances. Such splendid soldiers to Somalia who we feel proud to serve with. Pakistani soldiers have been completely dependable even in the most difficult circumstances. They have shouldered a huge and dangerous load for UNOSOM and the Somali people."

Exercises
The 35th FF Battalion participated in Cambrian Patrol and won Gold medal in 2010. Cambrian Patrol is a three-day military exercise organized by 160th (Wales) Brigade (part of 5th Infantry Division) of the British Army in Wales. The exercise involves various military drills including: Battle Procedure, Orders, Infiltration, Target Reconnaissance, Support to Friendly Forces, Battlefield Drills, Exfiltration, and Debriefing. The other participant countries include USA, Canada, Germany, France, India.

Commanders

Colonels in Chief
The officers of the regiment who are promoted to the designation of Chief of Army Staff are known as Colonels in Chief. It is an honorary appointment. The FF regiment has only the following Colonels in Chief since its formation.
 King George VI, 1937-1952
 General Muhammad Musa, HJ, HPk, HQA, MBE 
 General Abdul Waheed Kakar, HI (M), SBt. 18 May 1993 – 17 May 1997
 General Raheel Sharif, NI (M) 29 November 2013 – 29 November 2016

Colonel Commandants
The Colonel Commandant is an honorary designation given to the highest-ranked officer in service of the regiment. The Colonel Commandants since the creation of the regiment are listed below:

Battle honours
Piffers have won many honours for their gallantry deeds in each battle. They were also awarded foreign medals before the independence of Pakistan, including Victoria Cross. The Pakistani medals and honours bestowed upon Piffers are listed here:

Nishan-e-Haider recipients
Nishan-e-Haider is the highest military award given posthumously for valour, in Pakistan. The recipients of Nishan-e-Haider from the Frontier Force Regiment are:
 Major Muhammad Akram (4th FF)

When the Indo-Pakistani War of 1971 broke out, Major Muhammad Akram was commanding a company of 4th FF Battalion. His company was involved in the Battle of Hilli. On the opposite side India had an Infantry brigade with the support of a tank squadron which were making way for the 20th Mountain Division. Major Akram and his men fought for a whole fortnight against enemy who was superior both in number and fire power. Hilli was the only battle sector where the fight continued even after the Fall of Dhaka on 16 December 1971. Major Akram died in action while defending in an epic manner after defying surrender. For his sacrifice he was posthumously awarded Nishan-e-Haider.

 Major Shabbir Sharif (6th FF)

On 3 December 1971, Major Shabbir Sharif who was commanding a company of 6th FF Regiment near Sulemanki headworks, was assigned the task of capturing the high ground overlooking the Gurmukh Khera and Beriwala villages in the Sulemanki sector. On the opposite side India had more than a company of the Assam Regiment which was supported by a squadron of tanks.
Shabbir Sharif succeeded in capturing the area by early evening on 3 December. In this fight 43 Indian soldiers were killed, 28 were taken prisoner and four tanks were destroyed.
Shabbir Sharif repelled repeated counterattacks by the opposing forces for the next three days and nights and kept strategically better position, holding two Indian battalions at bay. On the night of 5 December/ 6, during one of the enemy attacks, Sharif hopped out of his trench, killed the enemy Company Commander of 4th Jat Regiment and recovered important documents from his possession. In another attack on the morning of 6 December, Shabbir Sharif took over an anti-tank gun from his gunner, and while engaging enemy tanks, he was killed in action by a direct hit from a tank. Major Shabbir Sharif already a recipient of Sitara-e-Jurat, was posthumously awarded Nishan-e-Haider for his sacrifice.

Hilal-i-Jur'at recipients
Hilal-i-Jur'at is the second highest military award given for valour to Armed forces personnel of Pakistan. Piffers who received Hilal-i-Jur'at are:
 Major General Mian Hayaud Din
 General Muhammad Musa
 Lieutenant Colonel Muhammad Akram Raja (Shaheed)

Sitara-e-Jurat recipients
Sitara-e-Jurat is the third highest military award given for valour to Armed forces personnel of Pakistan. Piffers who received Sitara-e-Jurat are:
 Major Muhammad Akbar Khan for Taitwal Sector 1948 (First recipient of SJ of Pakistan)
 Second Lieutenant Shabbir Sharif of 6th FF (for Chhamb Sector 1965) 
Captain Abdul Jalil (Shaheed) of 12th FF (for Sector 4 Kalidhar 1965)
 Captain Mujeeb Faqrullah Khan of 25th FFR (for Chamb-Jorian Sector 1971)
 Lt. Col. Khalid Nazir, 40th FF/12 NLI/SSG (Kargil Sector 1999)
 Capt Ammar Hussain Shaheed, 63rd FF- SSG (Kargil Sector 1999)
Col Amir Nawaz Khan of 13th FF (1971 war)

VC recipients
The Victoria Cross is the highest battle order of Britain, awarded for valour. As the Frontier Force regiment still maintains the lineage of its predecessor regiments, so this award was received by following Piffers:

 General John Watson (1st Punjab Cavalry)
 General Dighton Probyn (2nd Punjab Cavalry)
 Captain Henry William Pitcher (1st Punjab Infantry (P.I.F))
 Lieutenant Walter Hamilton (Corps of Guides)
 Major General William John Vousden (5th Punjab Cavalry)
 Lieutenant Hector Lachlan Stewart MacLean (Guides)
 Lieutenant William Bruce (59th Scinde Rifles)
 Captain Eustace Jotham (51st Sikhs)
 Subadar Mir Dast (55th Coke's Rifles)
 Captain Godfrey Meynell (Guides)
 Lieutenant Colonel Arthur Edward Cumming (2nd bn 12th Frontier Force Regiment)
 Jemadar Prakash Singh Chib (14/13 Frontier Force Rifles)
 Havildar Ali Haidar (6th Royal bn 13th Frontier Force Rifles) later 1stFF

MC recipients
The Military Cross is the third highest battle honour of Britain, awarded for valour. The Frontier Force regiment still maintains the lineage of its predecessor regiments so this award was received by following Piffers:

 Major Amar Singh (1/12 Frontier Force Regiment) 
 Major Himmat Singh Sandhu (1/12 Frontier Force Regiment) 
 Jemadar Nurab Shah (1/12 Frontier Force Regiment)
 Major T. L. R. G. Dodwell (1/12 Frontier Force Regiment)
 Subadar Mansabdar Khan (1/12 Frontier Force Regiment)
 Captain Atta Ullah (1/12 Frontier Force Regiment)
 Jemadar Dhanna Singh (1/12 Frontier Force Regiment)
 Lieutenant Harbans Singh, I.A.M.C (1/12 Frontier Force Regiment)
 Major D. A. T. Wilson (1/12 Frontier Force Regiment)
 Jemadar Feroze Khan (1/12 Frontier Force Regiment)
 Major D. E. Redsull (1/12 Frontier Force Regiment)
 Subedar Sadhu Singh Malhi (1/12 Frontier Force Regiment)
 Major D. Monckton (1/12 Frontier Force Regiment)
 Jemadar Mohinder Singh (1/12 Frontier Force Regiment)
 Subadar Mian Gul (1/12 Frontier Force Regiment)
 Jemadar Amir Shah (1/12 Frontier Force Regiment)
 Major G. J. Hawkins (2/12 Frontier Force Regiment)
 Subedar-Major Rai Singh (2/12 Frontier Force Regiment)
 Captain J. M. Ricketts (2/12 Frontier Force Regiment)
 Jemadar Ram Singh (2/12 Frontier Force Regiment)
 Captain S. H. Raw (3/12 Frontier Force Regiment)
 Jemadar Neuroze Khan (3/12 Frontier Force Regiment)
 Captain D. C. R. Stewart (3/12 Frontier Force Regiment)
 Major N. O. Finnis (3/12 Frontier Force Regiment)
 Captain E. G. D. Heard (3/12 Frontier Force Regiment)
 Captain Buta Singh (3/12 Frontier Force Regiment)
 Captain L. B. H. Reford (3/12 Frontier Force Regiment)
 Jemadar Santa Singh (3/12 Frontier Force Regiment)
 Subedar Pahlwan Khan (3/12 Frontier Force Regiment)
 Field Marshal Sam Manekshaw (then Captain) (4/12 Frontier Force Regiment)
 Lieutenant G. F. Bond (4/12 Frontier Force Regiment)
 Major P. C. Gupta (4/12 Frontier Force Regiment)
 Major J. W. Peyton (4/12 Frontier Force Regiment)
 Jemadar Qaim Shah, I.D.S.M (4/12 Frontier Force Regiment)
 Jemadar Udham Singh (4/12 Frontier Force Regiment)
 Jemadar Gul Mohd (4/12 Frontier Force Regiment)
 Subadar Bakhtawar Singh (4/12 Frontier Force Regiment)
 Captain P. Stewart (4/12 Frontier Force Regiment)
 Lieutenant General Attiqur Rahman (then Major) (4/12 Frontier Force Regiment)
 Jemadar Narain Singh (4/12 Frontier Force Regiment)
 Jemadar Phagga Singh (4/12 Frontier Force Regiment)
 Subadar Sultan Ali (4/12 Frontier Force Regiment)
 Subadar Bika Ram (4/12 Frontier Force Regiment)
 Subadar Mada Mir (4/12 Frontier Force Regiment)
 Major Amrik Singh (4/12 Frontier Force Regiment)
 Jemadar Nur Khan (5/12 Frontier Force Regiment) 
 Jemadar Bakhtawar Singh (8/12 Frontier Force Regiment)
 Major D. D. Slattery (8/12 Frontier Force Regiment)
 Captain P. H. Meadows (8/12 Frontier Force Regiment)
 Lieutenant T. R. Walton (9/12 Frontier Force Regiment)
 Subadar Tarlochan Chand (9/12 Frontier Force Regiment)
 Captain A. M. Khan (9/12 Frontier Force Regiment)
 Captain J. D. Gosling (9/12 Frontier Force Regiment)
 Major General Mian Hayaud Din(9/12 Frontier Force Regiment)
 Jemadar Sultan Ahmed Khan (9/12 Frontier Force Regiment)
 Subadar Kartar Singh (9/12 Frontier Force Regiment)
 Major N. C. Rawlley (9/12 Frontier Force Regiment)
 Jemadar Ram Singh (9/12 Frontier Force Regiment)
 Captain Kehar Singh Rai (9/12 Frontier Force Regiment)
 Captain M. J. Moynihan (9/12 Frontier Force Regiment)
 Major D. G. Butterworth (9/12 Frontier Force Regiment)
 Jemadar Kishen Singh (9/12 Frontier Force Regiment)
 Major C. G. Ferguson (9/12 Frontier Force Regiment)
 Major J. W. Hodges (Machine-gun Battalion/12 Frontier Force Regiment)
 Captain R. H. Plant( Machine-gun Battalion/12 Frontier Force Regiment)
 Subadar Karam Singh (Machine-gun Battalion/12 Frontier Force Regiment)
 Major General Adam Khan
 Lieutenant General Rakhman Gul (then Major) ((2/13 Frontier Force Rifles))
 Lieutenant General Bakhtiar Rana (then Major) (6/13 Frontier Force Rifles)

Legion d'Honneur recipients
Commandeur of the Légion d'honneur, the third of the five classes of the Légion d'honneur was awarded by the Republic of France for securing areas of Indo-China in 1946. The only Piffer to have received this distinction:
 Major General Mian Hayaud Din

Legion of Merit recipients
This is the highest military decoration that may be bestowed by the US Government upon a foreign national. Piffers who received the Legion of Merit are:
 Major General Mian Hayaud Din
 Major General Mian Ghulam Jilani
 Lieutenant General Raheel Sharif

Member of the Order of the British Empire (M.B.E.) – Military
This is the fourth class of the Order of the British Empire. Piffers who received the military division of the MBE are:
 Major General Mian Hayaud Din
 Lieutenant General Altaf Qadir
 General Muhammad Musa

Motto and colours

The motto of the regiment is Labbaik, an Arabic word, which means Here I Come. It is commonly used as an invocation to respond to Allah's call for pilgrimage during Hajj, the annual Muslims pilgrimage. Before 1970, each Piffer unit had its own motto but on the whole the regiment had no motto, so it was decided at the Piffer Conference in 1970 to adopt Labbaik as the regimental motto. The official meaning of this motto is:

—making all preparations required for going to battle, and putting ones heart and soul into the endeavour, aimed at achieving the assigned mission.

Piffers wear the same basic khaki uniform as in other regiments in the Pakistan Army, although the rank colour differs with Piffer personnel wearing rank insignia that are black with a red background. They also wear a badge on the shoulder strap of the uniform with "FF Regiment" written of it that uses the same colour combination. The colour of the Piffers' beret is rifle green with the insignia of the regiment at front. The Sam Browne belt worn by members of the regiment, which was designed by General Sir Sam Browne, is black in colour. The battle dress uniform worn by the regiment is camouflage without any distinctions since inception of new CCD.

Alliances
  – Argyll and Sutherland Highlanders; 1st Bn
  – The Duke of Lancaster's Regiment (King's Lancashire and Border); 1st and 15th Bn
  – The Argyll and Sutherland Highlanders of Canada (Princess Louise's); 1st Bn
  – The Rifles; 2nd and 13th Bn
  – The Royal Welsh; 3rd Bn
  – Royal Anglian Regiment; 5th Bn
  – Royal Irish Regiment (27th (Inniskilling) 83rd, 87th and Ulster Defence Regiment); 9th Bn
  – The King's Own Calgary Regiment; 15th Bn

See also
 Punjab Regiment
 Baloch Regiment
 Azad Kashmir Regiment
 Sind Regiment
 Northern Light Infantry Regiment
 Mujahid Force

Footnotes

References

Bibliography

External links
 The Frontier Force, before the independence of Pakistan.
 Land Forces of Britain, the Empire and Commonwealth: The Frontier Force Regiment
 Land Forces of Britain, the Empire and Commonwealth: 12th Frontier Force Regiment
 Land Forces of Britain, the Empire and Commonwealth: 13th Frontier Force Rifles
 Land Forces of Britain, the Empire and Commonwealth: The Pathan Regiment
 [ Land Forces of Britain, the Empire and Commonwealth: Queen Victoria's Own Corps of Guides (Frontier Force) (Lumsden's)]
 President Musharraf praises FF
 Nishan-e-Haider Recipients of FF Regiment 

 
British Indian Army infantry regiments
Infantry regiments of Pakistan
Military in Khyber Pakhtunkhwa